Tommy Thumb's Pretty Song-Book is the first extant anthology of English nursery rhymes, published in London in 1744. It contains the oldest printed texts of many well-known and popular rhymes, as well as several that eventually dropped out of the canon of rhymes for children. A copy is held in the British Library. In 2013 a facsimile edition with an introduction by Andrea Immel and Brian Alderson was published by the Cotsen Occasional Press.

Publication
With the full title of Tommy Thumb's Pretty Song Book Voll. [sic] II, this was a sequel to the now lost Tommy Thumb's Song Book, published in London by Mary Cooper in 1744. For many years, it was thought that there was only a single copy in existence, now in the British Library, but in 2001 another copy appeared and was sold for £45,000. As a result, this is the oldest printed collection of English nursery rhymes that is available. Henry Carey's 1725 satire on Ambrose Philips, Namby Pamby, quotes or alludes to some half-dozen or so nursery rhymes. The rhymes and illustrations were printed from copper plates, the text being stamped with punches into the plates, a technique borrowed from map and music printing.   It is 3×1 inches and it is printed in alternate openings in red and black ink.

Contents
The book contains forty nursery rhymes, many of which are still popular, including;
Baa Baa Black Sheep
Girls and Boys Come Out To Play
Hickory Dickory Dock
Ladybird Ladybird
Little Robin Redbreast
Little Tommy Tucker
London Bridge is Falling Down
Mary Mary Quite Contrary
Oranges and Lemons
Ride a Cock Horse to Banbury Cross
Sing a Song of Sixpence
There Was an Old Woman Who Lived Under a Hill
Who Killed Cock Robin?

There are also a number of less familiar rhymes, some of which were probably unsuitable for later sensibilities, including:

 Piss a Bed,
 Piss a Bed,
 Barley Butt,
 Your Bum is so heavy,
 You can't get up.

Some nursery rhymes turn up in disguise:

 The Moon shines Bright,
 The Stars give a light,
 And you may kiss
 A pretty girl
 At ten a clock at night.

This is an earlier version of:

 When I was a little boy
 My mammy kept me in,
 Now I am a great boy,
 I'm fit to serve the king.
 I can handle a musket,
 And I can smoke a pipe.
 And I can kiss a pretty girl
 At twelve o'clock at night.

References

External links
Tommy Thumb's Pretty Song Book at the British Library

 Lina Eckstein, Comparative Studies in Nursery Rhymes, p. 7

British books
1744 books
Collections of nursery rhymes